In chemistry, a parent structure is the structure of an unadorned ion or molecule from which derivatives can be visualized.  Parent structures underpin systematic nomenclature and facilitate classification. Fundamental parent structures have one or no functional groups and often have various types of symmetry. Benzene is a chemical itself consisting of a hexagonal ring of carbon atoms with a hydrogen atom attached to each, and is the parent of many derivatives that have substituent atoms or groups replacing one or more of the hydrogens.  Some parents are rare or nonexistent themselves, as in the case of porphine, though many simple and complex derivatives are known.

IUPAC definitions
According to the International Union of Pure and Applied Chemistry, the concept of parent structure is closely related to or identical to parent compound, parent name, or simply parent.

Organic parents
These species consist of an unbranched chain of skeletal atoms, or consisting of an unsubstituted monocyclic or polycyclic ring system. Parent structures bearing one or more functional groups that are not specifically denoted by a suffix are called functional parents. Names of parent structures are used in IUPAC nomenclature as basis for systematic names.

Hydride parents
A parent hydride is a parent structure with one or more hydrogen atoms. Parent hydrides have a defined standard population of hydrogen atoms attached to a skeletal structure. Parent hydrides are used extensively in organic nomenclature, but are also used in inorganic chemistry.

See also
Hydride
Preferred IUPAC name

References

Chemical nomenclature